iTunes Originals – PJ Harvey is a 2004 virtual album by British singer-songwriter PJ Harvey, released exclusively through iTunes as part of the iTunes Originals series of digital albums. The album is not available in any physical format.

The album features a selection of Harvey's well-known singles, along with a selection of interviews and live performances recorded exclusively for this release. It also marks the first commercial release of the title track from her then current album, Uh Huh Her.

Track listing
All songs (except for interviews) written by PJ Harvey.

"Dress" First Got People Interested in Me (Interview) 1:00
"Dress" (Album Version) 3:20
An Old Fashioned Fairy Tale (Interview) 0:21
"Fountain" (iTunes Originals Version) 2:56
Dark Things Happening (Interview) 1:21
"Down by the Water" (Album Version) 3:17
The Perfect Band for a Perfect Day (Interview) 2:00
"A Perfect Day Elise" (iTunes Originals Version) 3:13
Why The Stories Album Was So Successful (Interview) 3:33
"Good Fortune" (iTunes Originals Version) 2:47
Collaborating with Thom Yorke (Interview) 0:16
"This Mess We're In" (Album Version) 4:02
Ugly Is a Good Start (Interview) 1:44
"The Life and Death of Mr. Badmouth" (iTunes Originals Version) 7:43
Living in Fear of Comfort (Interview) 4:06
"The Letter" (Album Version) 3:19
Two Ferrets in a Bag Trying to Get Out (Interview) 1:59
"Uh Huh Her" (iTunes Originals Version) 6:34
There's Beauty in Darker Days (Interview) 3:35
"The Darker Days of Me & Him" (iTunes Originals Version) 8:00

References 

PJ Harvey albums
ITunes Originals
2004 live albums
2004 compilation albums